The Lo Nuestro Award for Ranchero Artist of the Year  was an award presented annually by American network Univision. It was first awarded in 2001 and has been given annually since. The accolade was established to recognize the most talented performers of Latin music. The nominees and winners were originally selected by a voting poll conducted among program directors of Spanish-language radio stations in the United States and also based on chart performance on Billboard Latin music charts, with the results being tabulated and certified by the accounting firm Deloitte. At the present time, the winners are selected by the audience through an online survey. The trophy awarded is shaped in the form of a treble clef.

The award was first presented to American singer Pepe Aguilar in 2001. Mexican performer Vicente Fernández and Aguilar both hold the record for the most awards with 5, out of ten nominations and twelve nominations. Mexican singer Alicia Villarreal is the most nominated performer without a win, with three unsuccessful nominations. Mexican-American performer Jenni Rivera is the first and only female artist to have won the award. In 2014, the category was disestablished.

Winners and nominees
Listed below are the winners of the award for each year, as well as the other nominees for the majority of the years awarded.

See also
 Latin Grammy Award for Best Ranchero Album

References

Ranchera
Ranchero Artist of the Year
Awards established in 2001
Awards disestablished in 2014